Aliabad (also Romanized as ‘Alīābād) is a village in Ferdows Rural District, Ferdows District, Rafsanjan County, Kerman Province, Iran. At the 2006 census, its population was 399, in 109 families.

References 

Populated places in Rafsanjan County